The Algerian Volleyball Championship, now called the ABC National 1, formally known as the ABC Super Division, is the pre-eminent men's volleyball league in Algeria, National 1 is contested by 16 teams, with the two lowest-placed teams relegated to the Second Division and replaced by the two winner of the playoffs. From the 1963 onwards, GS Pétroliers (19 titles) and WA Boufarik (9 titles) both dominated Also there is Darak El-Watani won 11 titles but it no longer exists, though National 1 also saw other champions, including OC Alger, ASM Oran, USM Alger, RAM Alger, MC Oran, NB Staouéli, AS PTT Alger and CSM Constantine.

History

List of Men's champions

Titles by team

Members of the Algerian Men's Volleyball League (2021–22 season)

These are the teams that participate in the 2021–22 Algerian Volleyball League season:

Group Center-West

Group Center-East

See also
Algerian Women's Volleyball League

References

External links
 Volleyball in Algeria

Volleyball in Algeria
Algeria
1962 establishments in Algeria
Sports leagues established in 1962
Volleyball